The Koepelgevangenis is a former prison in Arnhem, Netherlands. It is one of three Panopticon-style  buildings situated in the country. Designed by Johan Metzelaar, the building was completed in 1886. A Rijksmonument, the prison closed in 2016. After the prison's closure, the building, along with the one at Haarlem, was used to house asylum seekers to the Netherlands.

See also
Koepelgevangenis (Breda)

References

External links
Koepelgevangenis: Cellengebouw in Arnhem at rijksmonumenten.nl (in Dutch)
Koepelgevangenis at arneym.nl (in Dutch)

Prisons in the Netherlands
Rijksmonuments in Arnhem